In linguistics and philosophy, the denotation of an expression is its literal meaning. For instance, the English word "warm" denotes the property of being warm. Denotation is contrasted with other aspects of meaning including connotation. For instance, the word "warm" may evoke calmness or cosiness, but these associations are not part of the word's denotation. Similarly, an expression's denotation is separate from pragmatic inferences it may trigger. For instance, describing something as "warm" often implicates that it is not hot, but this is once again not part of the word's denotation.

Denotation plays a major role in several fields. Within philosophy of language, denotation is studied as an important aspect of meaning. In mathematics and computer science, assignments of denotations are assigned to expressions are a crucial step in defining interpreted formal languages. The main task of formal semantics is to reverse engineer the computational system which assigns denotations to expressions of natural languages.

In linguistic semantics 

In natural language semantics, denotations are conceived of as the outputs of the semantic component of the grammar. For example, the denotation of the word "blue" is the property of being blue and the denotation of the word "Barack Obama" is the person who goes by that name. Phrases also have denotations which are computed according to the principle of compositionality. For instance, the verb phrase "passed the class" denotes the property of having passed the class. Depending on one's particular theory of semantics, denotations may be identified either with terms' extensions, intensions, or other structures such as context change potentials.

When uttered in discourse, expressions may convey other associations which are not computed by the grammar and thus are not part of its denotation. For instance, depending on the context, saying "I ran five miles" may convey that you ran exactly five miles and not more. This content is not part of the sentence's denotation, but is rather pragmatic inferences arrived at by applying social cognition to its denotation.

Denotation, meaning, and reference 
Linguistic discussion of the differences between denotation, meaning, and reference is rooted in the work of Ferdinand de Saussure, specifically in his theory of semiotics written in the book Course in General Linguistics. Philosophers Gottlob Frege and Bertrand Russell have also made influential contributions to this subject.

Denotation and reference 
Although they have similar meanings, denotation should not be confused with reference. A reference is a specific person, place, or thing that a speaker identifies when using a word. Vocabulary from John Searle's speech act theory can be used to define this relationship. According to this theory, the speaker action of identifying a person, place, or thing is called referring. The specific person, place, or thing identified by the speaker is called the referent. Reference itself captures the relationship between the referent and the word or phrase used by the speaker. For referring expressions, the denotation of the phrase is most likely the phrase's referent. For content words, the denotation of the word can refer to any object, real or imagined, to which the word could be applied.

Denotation and meaning 
In "On Sense and Reference", philosopher Gottlob Frege began the conversation about distinctions between meaning and denotation when he evaluated words like the German words "Morgenstern" and "Abendstern". Author Thomas Herbst uses the words "kid" and "child" to illustrate the same concept. According to Herbst, these two words have the same denotation, as they have the same member set; however, "kid" may be used in an informal speech situation whereas "child" may be used in a more formal speech situation.

In other fields
 In computer science, denotational semantics is contrasted with operational semantics.
In media studies terminology, denotation is an example of the first level of analysis: what the audience can visually see on a page. Denotation often refers to something literal, and avoids being a metaphor. Here it is usually coupled with connotation which is the second level of analysis, being what the denotation represents.

See also
 Connotation
 Denotationalism
 Linguistic competence
 Principle of compositionality
 Reference
 Sense and reference

References

External links
 Semiotics for Beginners 
 VirtuaLit Elements of Poetry

Philosophy of language
Lexicology
Meaning (philosophy of language)
Formal semantics (natural language)